Santi Gioacchino ed Anna ai Monti (Saints Joachim and Anne on the hills) is a church on the Via Monte Polacco in Rome.

Pope Clement XIII demolished a thirty-seven-year-old Minim monastery on this site (founded in 1723 by Fr. Francesco Narici) in 1760 to make way for a new monastery and the present church.  The church, on a Greek cross plan, barrel-vaulted and with a central dome, was consecrated in 1781 by Pope Pius VI.  Its 18th-century façade has four pilasters with Corinthian capitals and is crowned by an undecorated tympanon.

The main decorations are stucco cherubs, including a tympanum above the high altar with cherubs in glory and a painting of the Madonna, St Anne and St Joachim.

The church is served by diocesan clergy.

External links
Nyborg

Religious organizations established in 1781
1780s establishments in Italy
18th-century Roman Catholic church buildings in Italy